Codex Regius ("Royal Book" or "King's Book") or GKS 2365 4º is an Icelandic codex in which many Old Norse poems from the Poetic Edda are preserved. Thought to have been written during the 1270s, it is made up of 45 vellum leaves. The work originally contained a further eight leaves, which are now missing. It is the sole source for most of the poems it contains. In scholarly texts, this manuscript is commonly abbreviated as [R] for Codex Regius, or as [K] for Konungsbók.

The codex was discovered in 1643, when it came into the possession of Brynjólfur Sveinsson, then Bishop of Skálholt in Iceland, who in 1662 sent it as a gift to King Frederick III of Denmark; hence the name. It was then kept in the Royal Library in Copenhagen until April 21, 1971, when it was brought back to Reykjavík, and is now kept in the Árni Magnússon Institute for Icelandic Studies. Because air travel at the time was not entirely trustworthy with such precious cargo, it was transported by ship, accompanied by a military escort.

One of the principal manuscripts of Snorri's Edda (GKS 2367 4to) is also named Codex Regius. Composed of 55 vellum pages, dating from the early 14th century, it was part of the same gift from Bishop Brynjólfur to Frederick III. It was returned to Iceland in 1985, where it is now also in the Árni Magnússon Institute for Icelandic Studies.

Contents

In popular culture
 Codex Regius is the subject of a thriller by the Icelandic writer Arnaldur Indridason.
 Michael Haneke stated that the title of his 2003 film Time of the Wolf was taken from the Codex Regius, specifically from the “Prophecy of the Völva.”
 Werner Herzog reads aloud an English translation of one poem in his 2016 film Into the Inferno.

References

External links
Finnur Jónsson's Facsimile Edition of 1891.
Stafrænt handritasafn (Photographs)
CyberSamurai Encyclopedia of Norse Mythology: Lieder-Edda 
CyberSamurai Encyclopedia of Norse Mythology: Lieder-Edda (Old-Nordic)

1270s books
Icelandic manuscripts
Old Norse literature